Graves Without a Name is a 2018 French-Cambodian documentary film edited, co-written, and directed by Rithy Panh. It was selected as the Cambodian entry for the Best Foreign Language Film at the 91st Academy Awards, but it was not nominated.

See also
List of submissions to the 91st Academy Awards for Best Foreign Language Film
List of Cambodian submissions for the Academy Award for Best Foreign Language Film

References

External links

2018 films
2018 documentary films
Cambodian documentary films
Films directed by Rithy Panh
French documentary films
2010s French-language films
Khmer-language films
2010s French films